Grand Island Senior High School is a public high school located at 1100 Ransom Road in  Grand Island, New York, serving over 1,000 students in grades 9–12. The school follows the New York State  Regents Board curriculum. Advanced Placement classes are offered in 16 subjects including Biology, Calculus, Physics C: Mechanics and Electricity/Magnetism, and US History. Many students participate in a BOCES program which allows them to experience many occupations before pursuing them and gaining useful training and certifications. Students' averages are calculated using a percentage based scale.

The school is under the jurisdiction of the Grand Island Central School District.

Academics
In 2009, Grand Island Senior High School was ranked 2 out of 131 Western New York high schools in terms of academics.

Alumni
Marc Scibilia
Dale Brown
Carlin Hartman
Brett Kern
Stacy Clark
Jimmy Arias

References

Public high schools in New York (state)
High schools in Erie County, New York